The economy of the State of New York is reflected in its gross state product in 2022-Q2 of $US2.0 trillion, ranking third in size behind the larger states of California and Texas. If New York State were an independent nation, it would rank as the 10th largest economy in the world. However, in 2019, the multi-state, New York City-centered metropolitan statistical area produced a gross metropolitan product (GMP) of $US2.0 trillion, ranking first nationally by a wide margin and behind the GDP of only nine nations.

The state has a large manufacturing sector, which includes printing and publishing and the production of garments, furs, railroad rolling stock, and bus line vehicles. Some industries are concentrated in upstate locations also, such as ceramics and glass (the southern tier of counties), microchips and nanotechnology (Albany) and the Greater Capital District, and photographic equipment (Rochester). New York's agricultural outputs comprise dairy products, cattle and other livestock, vegetables, nursery stock, and apples. In April 2021, GlobalFoundries, a company specializing in the semiconductor industry, moved its headquarters from Silicon Valley, California to its most advanced semiconductor-chip manufacturing facility in Saratoga County near a section of the Adirondack Northway, in Malta, New York.

New York City

New York City, characterized as the world's premier financial center, and the surrounding New York metropolitan area dominate the economy of the state. Manhattan is the leading center of banking, finance, and communication in the United States and is the location of the New York Stock Exchange (NYSE) on Wall Street. Many of the world's largest corporations locate their home offices in Manhattan or in nearby Westchester County. Manhattan contained over 500 million square feet (46.5 million m2) of office space in 2015, making it the largest office market in the United States, while Midtown Manhattan, with nearly 400 million square feet (37.2 million m2) in 2015, is the largest central business district in the world.

Long Island

The counties of Nassau and Suffolk have long been known for their affluence. Long Island has a very high standard of living with residents paying some of the highest property taxes in the country. In opulent pockets of the North Shore of Long Island and South Shore, assets have passed from one generation to the next over time.

From about 1930 to about 1990, Long Island was one of the aviation centers of the United States, with companies such as Grumman Aircraft having their headquarters and factories in the Bethpage area. Grumman was long a major supplier of Carrier-based aircraft. Parts are still made for assembly elsewhere.

Long Island is home to the East Coast's largest industrial park, the Hauppauge Industrial Park. The park has over 1,300 tenant companies employing over 55,000 Long Islanders.

Long Island has played a prominent role in scientific research and in engineering. It is the home of the Brookhaven National Laboratory. Seven Nobel prizes have been awarded for work conducted at Brookhaven lab.

Tourism thrives primarily in the summer, especially on the east end of Suffolk County.  The east end of the island is still partly agricultural, now including many vineyards and pumpkin farms as well as traditional truck farming.

Fishing also continues to be an important industry, especially at Northport and Montauk.  A moderately large saltwater commercial fishery operates on the Atlantic side of Long Island. The principal catches by value are clams, lobsters, squid, and flounder. There was in past centuries a large oyster fishery in New York waters as well, but at present, oysters comprise only a small portion of the total value of seafood harvested.

Perhaps the best known aspect of the fishing sector is the famous Fulton Fish Market in New York City, which distributes not only the New York catch but imported seafood from all over the world. At the turn of the 21st century the market moved from Fulton Street in Manhattan to The Bronx.

Mining 

New York's mining sector is concentrated in three areas. The first is near New York City. Primarily, this area specializes in construction materials for use in the city, but it also contains the emery mines south of Peekskill in Westchester County, one of two locations in the U.S. where that mineral is extracted. The second area is the Adirondack Mountains. This is an area of very specialized products, including talc, industrial garnets, and zinc. The Adirondacks are not part of the Appalachian system, despite their location, but are structurally part of the mineral-rich Canadian Shield. In the inland southwestern part of the state, in the Allegheny Plateau, is a region of drilled wells. The only major liquid output at present is salt in the form of brine; however, there are also small to moderate petroleum reserves in this area. Geothermal energy potential is being explored in the state, with 24 drilling applications being submitted to the Division of Mineral Resources in 2005. Cryptocurrency is also mined in Upstate New York.

Exports 

New York exports a wide variety of goods such as foodstuffs, commodities, minerals, manufactured goods, cut diamonds, and automobile parts. New York's top five export markets in 2004 were Canada ($30.2 billion), United Kingdom ($3.3 billion), Japan ($2.6 billion), Israel ($2.4 billion), and Switzerland ($1.8 billion). New York's largest imports are oil, gold, aluminum, natural gas, electricity, rough diamonds, and lumber.

Canada has become a very important economic partner of New York. 23% of the state's total worldwide exports went to Canada in 2004. Tourism also constitutes a significant part of the economy.

Agriculture 

The Erie Canal, completed in 1825, opened eastern markets to Midwest farm products. The canal also contributed to the growth of New York City, helped create large cities, and encouraged immigration to the state. Except in the mountain regions, the areas between cities are agriculturally rich. The Finger Lakes region has orchards producing apples, which are one of New York's leading crops. The state is known for wines produced at vineyards in the Finger Lakes region and Long Island. The state also produces other crops, especially grapes, strawberries, cherries, pears, onions, and potatoes. New York is a major supplier of maple syrup and is the third leading producer of dairy goods in the United States.

According to the Department of Agriculture and Markets, New York's agricultural production returned more than $3.6 billion to the farm economy in 2005. 36,000 farms occupy 7.6 million acres or about 25 percent of the state’s land area, to produce a variety of food products. Here are some of the items in which New York ranks high nationally:

New York is an agricultural leader and is one of the top five states for agricultural products, including dairy, cattle, apples, cabbages, potatoes, beets, viticulture, onions, maple syrup and many others. The state is the second largest producer of cabbage in the U.S. The state has about a quarter of its land in farms and produced $3.4 billion in agricultural products in 2001. The south shore of Lake Ontario provides the right mix of soils and microclimate for apple, cherry, plum, pear and peach orchards. Apples are also grown in the Hudson Valley and near Lake Champlain. The south shore of Lake Erie and the southern Finger Lakes hillsides have vineyards. New York is the nation's third-largest grape-producing state, after California and Washington. In 2004, New York's wine and grape industry brought $6 billion into the state economy. The state has 30,000 acres (120 km²) of vineyards, 212 wineries, and produced 200 million bottles of wine in 2004.

New York was heavily glaciated in the ice age leaving much of the state with deep, fertile, though somewhat rocky soils. Row crops, including hay, corn, wheat, oats, barley, and soybeans, are grown. Particularly in the western part of the state, sweet corn, peas, carrots, squash, cucumbers and other vegetables are grown. The Hudson and Mohawk Valleys are known for pumpkins and blueberries. The glaciers also left numerous swampy areas, which have been drained for the rich humus soils called muckland which is mostly used for onions, potatoes, celery and other vegetables. Dairy farms are present throughout much of the state. Cheese is a major product, often produced by Amish or Mennonite farm cheeseries. New York is rich in nectar-producing plants and is a major honey-producing state. The honeybees are also used for pollination of fruits and vegetables. Most commercial beekeepers are migratory, taking their hives to southern states for the winter. Most cities have Farmers' markets which are well supplied by local farmers.

Energy

In 2017, New York State consumed 156,370-gigawatthours (GWh) of electrical energy. Downstate regions (Hudson Valley, New York City, and Long Island) consumed 66% of that amount. Upstate regions produced 50% of that amount. The peak load in 2017 was 29,699 MW. The resource capability in 2017 was 42,839 MW. The NYISO's market monitor described the average all-in wholesale electric price as a range (a single value was not provided) from $25 per MWh to $53 per MWh for 2017.

References